The North Dakota Army National Guard (ND ARNG) is headquartered at the Fraine Barracks in Bismarck, North Dakota, and consists of the 68th Troop Command, headquartered in Bismarck, and the 141st Maneuver Enhancement Brigade, headquartered in Fargo, North Dakota. Their main installation and armory is at Camp Grafton.

Structure
Joint Force Headquarters-Bismarck
1919th Contract Team-Bismarck
3/819th JAG Team-Bismarck
68th Troop Command-Bismarck
ARNG Medical Detachment-Bismarck
Recruiting & Retention Battalion-Bismarck
116th Public Affairs Detachment-Bismarck
142d Engineer Battalion (previously the 231st Brigade Support Battalion)-Valley City
 Headquarters and Headquarters Company-Valley City
 Company A-Fargo
 Detachment 1-Valley City
 Company B-Fargo
164th Regiment (Regional Training Institute)
136th Combat Sustainment Support Battalion Headquarters-Camp Gilbert C. Grafton-Devils Lake
141st Maneuver Enhancement Brigade-Fargo
 Headquarters and Headquarters Company
3662nd Maintenance Company-Camp Gilbert C. Grafton-Devils Lake
816th Military Police Company-Dickinson
1/816th Military Police Company-Bismarck
1/132nd Quartermaster Detachment-Bottineau
164th Engineer Battalion Headquarters-Minot
 Headquarters & Headquarters Company-Minot
 164th Forward Support Company-Minot
 817th Engineer Company (Sapper)-Jamestown
 818th Engineer Company (Sapper)-Minot
 Detachment 1-Williston
 Engineer Platoon (Sapper)
 Engineer Platoon (Sapper)
 957th Engineer Company (Multi Role Bridge)-Bismarck
Detachment 42, Organizational Support Airlift-Bismarck
81st Civil Support Team-Bismarck
3662nd Component Repair Company Maintenance Company-Bismarck
1st Battalion (Security & Support), 112th Aviation Regiment-Bismarck
C Company, 2nd Battalion, 285th Aviation Regiment-Bismarck
2-832nd Medical Company-Bismarck
814th Medical Detachment-Bismarck
2/191st Military Police Company- Bismarck
2/132nd Quartermaster Detachment-Rugby
835th Engineer Detachment-Camp Grafton
897th Engineer Detachment (Concrete)-Camp Grafton
815th Engineer Company (Horizontal)-Edgeley
Detachment 1-Wishek
Detachment 2-Lisbon
Detachment 3-Jamestown
188th Engineer Company (Vertical)-Wahpeton
Engineer Platoon (Vertical)
Engineer Platoon (Vertical)
Engineer Platoon (Horizontal)
188th Army Band-Fargo
191st Military Police Company-Fargo
231st Distribution Company-Fargo
231st Support Maintenance Company-Fargo
426th Signal Company-Fargo
1/231st Distribution Company-Valley City
1/231st Support Maintenance Company-Valley City
1/191st Military Police Company-Grand Forks
132nd Quartermaster Company-Grand Forks
1st Battalion, 188th Air Defense Artillery Regiment
 Headquarters & Headquarters Battery-Grand Forks
 Battery A-Bismarck
 Battery B-Grand Forks
 Battery C-Fargo
 Detachment D-Grand Forks
133rd Quartermaster Detachment-Grafton
134th Quartermaster Detachment-Cavalier
3/132nd Quartermaster Detachment-Cando

History

In 1883, Company A, First Regiment, Dakota National Guard, was organized at Bismarck, Dakota Territory. In 1889, North Dakota became the Union's thirty-ninth state. The North Dakota National Guard was organized, comprising six infantry companies, two cavalry troops, and one artillery battery. Eight infantry companies of the First North Dakota Regiment were mobilized for the Spanish–American War and the Philippine–American War in 1898. The Regiment earned thirty-nine silver battle rings for its guidon and ten members of the First North Dakota Infantry Volunteers were awarded the Medal of Honor.

Historic units
  164th Infantry Regiment

References

External links
 Official Website
 Bibliography of North Dakota Army National Guard History compiled by the United States Army Center of Military History

United States Army National Guard by state
Military in North Dakota
1889 establishments in North Dakota